Geraldine Plunkett is an Irish actress known for her part as Mary McDermott-Moran in the Irish television series Glenroe. Geraldine Plunkett has recently taken up another new soap role playing Rose O’Brien, mother to Eoghan O’Brien on RTÉ’s popular Fair City. Geraldine’s current storyline on Fair City is that her Dementia is starting to get worse and it’s going to cause some emotional problems for the wider O’Brien family. www.rte.ie/faircity
She also played a recurring character for the first 3 seasons on The Clinic.
Theatre roles include Juno in Seán O'Casey's Juno and the Paycock, played opposite Donal McCann (the Paycock – Captain Boyle) 1980.

Filmography

References

External links 

20th-century Irish actresses
21st-century Irish actresses
Irish stage actresses
Irish television actresses
Living people
Place of birth missing (living people)
Year of birth missing (living people)